Phrynetoides is a genus of longhorn beetles of the subfamily Lamiinae, containing the following species:

 Phrynetoides minor Schwarzer, 1931
 Phrynetoides regius (Aurivillius, 1886)

References

Phrynetini